In Romani communities in North America and some areas of Europe, the rom baro is the tribal leader. He earns his position through merit, and his decisions ‒ although considered wise ‒ do not have the automatic approval of the community. Other factors in the selection of a rom baro include knowledge of the language of the areas of planned travel and resourcefulness in emergency situations.

Etymology
The term baro is of Indic origin, and implies not only "big", but also powerful and important. Some Canadian and American Romani groups have substituted the term shato, a contraction of O Baro Shato, "the bigshot".

Tribal Leaders 
The rom baro are chosen by their communities; the main criteria for choosing a rom baro is their intelligence and a sense of fairness. The leaders are usually older in age, as the older a Roma is, the better knowledge of Romani law and traditions they are viewed as having. They act as advisors for the king of their respective tribe or company and are usually fairly wealthy. A rom baro is elected for life and the position is not inheritable. The rom baro are the head of their patriarchal groups known as familias but, their authority extends far beyond their own familias, encompassing their respective tribes or companies. The role of the rom baro is to handle all the internal problems in their tribe or company such as disagreements in work, marriage, family relations, trials, funerals, etc., while also, dealing with gadje authorities in making sure their tribe is in good standing with the American law, arranging work, and handling outside pressures to assimilate. While the rom baro has a considerable amount of power and influence among their Roma tribe, they are still subject to the Romani law and the Kris (Romani court). A rom baro who fails to provide for his community or breaks the Romani law will be removed from his position by the Kris. This includes getting in trouble with gadje authorities and revealing Romani secrets which will make them not only lose their position, but also be outcast from the tribe and considered impure.

Notable rom baros 
Jimmy Marks; the rom baro of the Spokane Roma until he was deposed for getting in trouble with the law and revealing the secrets of the Roma.

See also
 Gadjo (non-Romani)

 Romanipen (Romani spirit)

References

Romani society
Romani words and phrases
Titles of national or ethnic leadership